Katnarat (also Romanized as Kat’narrat and Katnarrat; formerly, Lorplemsovkhoz, Loriyskiy Sovkhoz) is a town in the Lori Province of Armenia. The town was originally a sovkhoz (collective farm).

References

Populated places in Lori Province